Kevin West is an American politician and businessman serving as a member of the Oklahoma House of Representatives from the 54th district. Elected in November 2016, he assumed office on January 9, 2017.

Early life and education 
West was born in Oklahoma City. He studied construction management at Northeastern Oklahoma A&M College for one year.

Career 
West was the owner of Sooner Fixtures from 1996 to 2004. From 2004 to 2007, he was a project manager for Wood Systems. He later worked for a cabinetry company before becoming a manager at Precision Casework, a cabinet maker in Oklahoma City. He was elected to the Oklahoma House of Representatives in November 2016 and assumed office on January 9, 2017. During the 2017 legislative session, West served as vice chair of the House Rules Committee. He has since served as chair of the House General Government Committee.

References 

Living people
Politicians from Oklahoma City
Republican Party members of the Oklahoma House of Representatives
21st-century American politicians
Year of birth missing (living people)